Siva Senai  is a political group in Sri Lanka formed to protect the interests of Sri Lankan Tamil Hindus formed on 12 October 2016. Maravanpulavu Sachchithananthan, a former United Nations official is the founder of the group, which has received encouragement from the Indian political party Shiv Sena. Siva Senai spearheaded an initiative in December 2017 to allow Sri Lankan pilgrims to visit Chidambaram in Tamil Nadu, India. The group has also actively advocated against cattle slaughter in Sri Lanka.

In 2018, supporters of Siva Senai held protests in Jaffna against cattle slaughter. It also protested against Muslim teachers in Hindu schools wearing Abaya which it believes is an attempt of Islamisation of Hindus.

References

Citations

Sources

External links 
 

Political parties in Sri Lanka
Hinduism in Sri Lanka
Political parties established in 2016
Hindu nationalism
Tamil political parties in Sri Lanka
2016 establishments in Sri Lanka
Sri Lankan Hindu revivalists
Hindu nationalists
Right-wing populist parties
Anti-Islam sentiment in Sri Lanka